Pseudoalteromonas piscicida is a marine bacterium. It is known to produce a quorum sensing molecule called 2-heptyl-4-quinolone (HHQ), which functions as a bacterial infochemical. Research into the effects of this infochemical on phytoplankton is currently being conducted by Dr. Kristen Whalen of Haverford College.

References

External links
Type strain of Pseudoalteromonas piscicida at BacDive -  the Bacterial Diversity Metadatabase

Alteromonadales